CS Lanaudière-Nord is a Canadian semi-professional soccer club based in Joliette, Quebec that plays in the Première Ligue de soccer du Québec. The team previously played in the PLSQ from 2012 to 2015 as FC L'Assomption-Lanaudière prior to its merger.

The club was formed from a merger in 2019 between FC L'Assomption-Lanaudière, who played in the PLSQ from 2012 to 2015, and ARS Laser. In 2016, they left the PLSQ, being replaced by FC Lanaudière, which was supported by all 13 local clubs, before re-acquiring the license for the 2022 season.

History

FC L'Assomption-Lanaudière

In 2012, the semi-professional club was established to play in the newly formed Première Ligue de soccer du Québec, a Division III league, as one of the founding members. They entered under the name FC L'Assomption. They finished in second place in the league's inaugural season, behind champions FC St-Léonard. Striker Frederico Moojen finished as the league's top goalscorer in each of the league's first three seasons. Beginning in the 2014 season, they became known as FC L'Assomption-Lanaudière.

The club departed the league following the 2015 season. They were replaced by FC Lanaudière, which was organized by the Lanaudière regional soccer association, supported by the region's 14 member clubs, including L'Assomption.

CS Lanaudière-Nord
In 2019, the club merged with another local club, l'Association de soccer Le Laser, to form the Club de Soccer Lanaudière-Nord.

In 2021, after acquiring their provincial license, they requested and were granted the transfer of the PLSQ license from FC Lanaudière back to the club, beginning in the 2022 season. They played their first match on May 7, losing 2-1 to CS St-Hubert.

Seasons 
as FC L'Assomption-Lanaudière

as CS Lanaudière-Nord

Notable former players

The following players have either played at the professional or international level, either before or after playing for the PLSQ team:

Coaching History
 Jean-Robert Toussaint (2012)
 Marco Antonio Torrens (2013)
 Eduardo Sebrango(2014)
 Marco Antonio Torrens (2014–2015)

See also
 FC Lanaudière

References

Soccer clubs in Quebec
L'Assomption-Lanaudière
Association football clubs established in 1986
1986 establishments in Quebec
Joliette